Kabaktepe can refer to:

 Kabaktepe, Aziziye
 Kabaktepe, Kozan